The hornophone is a musical instrument composed of a number of reed bulb horns, typically used as vehicle horns, clamped into a metal frame. The arrangement of the horns is much like a xylophone or glockenspiel, tuned to a heptatonic scale. Ordinarily there is either a higher or lower rack or mounting of horns tuned to sharps and flats, like the black notes of a musical keyboard. The instrument is typically played standing, by squeezing the bulbs of the horns.

Known performers 

The following are known performers of the Hornophone:

 Harry Hill
 Bill Bailey
 Nutty Noah

References 

Aerophones
Experimental musical instruments